Peter Yu Tae-chol (유대철 베드로) (c. 1826 – October 31, 1839) was one of the 103 canonised Korean Martyrs and a son of a government interpreter named Augustine Nyou Tjin-kil, also a martyr. His feast day is October 21, and he is also venerated along with the rest of the 103 Korean martyrs on September 20.

After giving himself up, he was tortured and then sent to prison, where he was strangled at the age of 13.

References

Bibliography
 The Lives of the 103 Martyr Saints of Korea 33: Saint Yu Tae-chol Peter (1826 ~ 1839), Catholic Bishops' Conference of Korea Newsletter No. 53 (Winter 2005).
 “Saint Petrus Yu Tae-Ch’ol“. CatholicSaints.Info. 4 June 2018. Web. 24 December 2018.

1826 births
1839 deaths
19th-century Korean people
19th-century Christian saints
19th-century executions by Korea
19th-century Roman Catholic martyrs
People from Seoul
Roman Catholic child saints
Executed children
Murdered Korean children
Executed Korean people
Korean Roman Catholic saints
People executed by strangulation
Korean torture victims
Joseon Christians